The 2021–22 season was the  Wellington Phoenix's 15th season since its establishment in 2007. The club participated in the A-League for the 15th time and in the FFA Cup for the 7th time. 

This season was the Phoenix's third season fully or partially based in Australia, starting towards the end of the 2019–20 season. This season was Ufuk Talay's third in charge; in May 2021 he renewed his contract until 2023.

Pre-season
The Phoenix finished 7th in the 2020–21 A-League season, one point short of finals series. On 21 May, the Phoenix announced that head coach Ufuk Talay had signed a 2-year contract extension with the club.

June
On 9 June, the Phoenix confirmed the departure of captain Ulises Dávila in spite of the club's record-setting efforts to retain him. He would later sign for Macarthur FC. On 10 June, the departure of Stefan Marinovic was confirmed by the Phoenix after he had signed with Israeli club Hapoel Nof HaGalil. On 15 June, the Phoenix announced the return of Gary Hooper on a two-year deal. On 23 June, the Phoenix re-signed Joshua Laws on a two-year contract. Following the conclusion of the 2020-21 A-League season, on 25 June, the Phoenix confirmed the departure of Cameron Devlin, Liam McGing, Luke DeVere, Te Atawhai Hudson-Wihongi, Matthew Ridenton, Charles Lokolingoy, and Mirza Muratovic. On 30 June, it was announced that left-back James McGarry signed a one-year contract extension.

July
On 10 July, it was announced that Tomer Hemed would not be re-signing with the club for the 2021-22 A-League season. Hemed had finished as the Phoenix's top goal-scorer with 11 goals. He would later sign for Western Sydney Wanderers. On 29 July, it was announced that defender Callan Elliot, who had previously played for the club, had returned on a two-year deal. On 30 July, the Phoenix announced the signing of Australian midfielder Nicholas Pennington on a two-year deal.

September
On 13 September, the Phoenix announced that academy players Ben Old and Alex Paulsen had signed three-year professional contracts with the club. On 27 September, Steven Taylor announced his shock retirement just days after being named captain.

October
On 13 October, the Phoenix bolstered their defensive stocks by securing a season-long loan deal for 20-year-old Melbourne Victory centre-back Matthew Bozinovski. On 18 October, the Phoenix announced the signing of Olyroo Luka Prso on a one-year deal. On 22 October, the Phoenix signed reserve team players George Ott and Kurtis Mogg on one-year scholarship contracts ahead of the A-League Men season.

November
In November the Phoenix played their last three preseason matches. They won against the Central Coast Mariners and Western Sydney Wanderers 1–0 and 2–1, respectively. The Phoenix would lose their last preseason match against Sydney by a 1–0 margin.

Players

Other players with first-team appearances

Transfers

From youth squad

Transfers in

Transfers out

Contract extensions

Technical staff

Friendlies

Competitions

Overview

A-League

League table

Results summary

Results by matchday

Matches

Finals series

FFA Cup

Squad statistics

Appearances and goals

|-
|colspan="16"|Goalkeepers:
|-

|-
|colspan="16"|Defenders:
|-

|-
|colspan="16"|Midfielders:
|-

|-
|colspan="16"|Forwards:
|-

|-
|colspan="16"|Players that have left the club:

|-

Clean sheets
Includes all competitive matches. The list is sorted by squad number when total clean sheets are equal.

Disciplinary records
Includes all competitive matches. The list is sorted by squad number when total disciplinary records are equal.

See also
 2021–22 Wellington Phoenix FC (A-League Women) season

References

External links
 Wellington Phoenix official website

Wellington Phoenix FC seasons
2021–22 A-League Men season by team